Jane Jackson became Jane Bianchi and later Jane Bianchi Lacy (1776 – 19 March  1858) was a British singer in London and Oudh.

Life 
Bianchi was born as Jane Jackson, the daughter of a London apothecary named John Jackson.

In 1800 she married the Italian composer Francesco Bianchi. She became known as the leading singer of Handel's music and she was often invited to Windsor Castle where she entertained George III and Queen Charlotte. On 12 March 1806 the Austrian composer Joseph Woelfl published "Six English Songs" which he dedicated to Bianchi.

She and Francesco had a daughter who died aged five, shortly after her husband took his own life. He and their daughter were buried in the old Kensington Church, now St Mary Abbots, Kensington.

Bianchi married again to another singer named William Lacy. Her English husband had trained in Italy and was a bass singer.

In 1813 she again sang at the Concerts of Antient Music where she was paid £126 (see illustration). She had sung at that concert in 1800 when she was "Miss Jackson". At somewhere around this time she published a song, "Winter's Beautiful Rose", which she had composed to accompany words by Amelia Opie. She dedicated the work to the Viscountesses Hampden.

They left England and sailed for Calcutta in 1818 where they stayed for seven years performing at the court of Oudh. At the time the King of Oudh was Saadat Ali Khan II.

Whilst she was away she published an unseen work by her first husband in 1820/1821.

Bianchi died in Ealing in 1858. Her second husband survived her.

References

External links
 

19th-century British women singers
1776 births
1858 deaths